Escape Into Night is a six-part British children's cult television serial made by ATV for ITV that was broadcast from 19 April to 24 May 1972. It was directed by Richard Bramall.

The serial was an adaptation of Catherine Storr's 1958 novel Marianne Dreams, and deals with a young girl, Marianne, whose drawings become the basis for dreams, and how the dividing line between dreams and reality blurs. The novel was later adapted into a 1988 film, Paperhouse.

The series was made in colour, but the original colour masters are missing; only black-and-white telerecordings of the series exists. These surviving recordings were released in the UK on Region 2 by Network Distributing Ltd Home Entertainment in May 2009.

For its theme music, Escape Into Night used a segment of the third movement of the Symphony No.6 in E minor by Ralph Vaughan Williams.

It was filmed at Barr Beacon, Aldridge.

Cast

External links
Action TV episode guide

TV Cream review

1972 British television series debuts
1972 British television series endings
1970s British children's television series
ITV children's television shows
Television series by ITV Studios
Television shows produced by Associated Television (ATV)
English-language television shows
British children's fantasy television series